William of the United Kingdom may refer to:

William IV of the United Kingdom (1765–1837), reigned 1830–1837
William, Prince of Wales (born 1982)

See also
William the Lion (c. 1142–1214), king of Scotland
William of England (disambiguation)
Prince William (disambiguation)#Royal princes
List of British monarchs
List of English monarchs